Guilherme Nunes Rodrigues (born 17 February 2001), known as Guilherme Pato, is a Brazilian professional footballer who plays as a forward.

Club career
Pato made his professional debut with Internacional in a 0-0 Campeonato Gaúcho tie with Ypiranga on 1 February 2020.

On 21 January 2022, Pato joined the Azerbaijani club Neftchi Baku on a contract until the summer of 2024. On 15 February 2023, Pato left Neftchi Baku by mutual agreement.

Career statistics

Honours
Cuiabá
Campeonato Mato-Grossense: 2021

References

External links
 Internacional Profile 

2001 births
Living people
Sportspeople from Rio Grande do Sul
Brazilian footballers
Association football forwards
Campeonato Brasileiro Série A players
Campeonato Brasileiro Série B players
Sport Club Internacional players
Associação Atlética Ponte Preta players
Cuiabá Esporte Clube players
Neftçi PFK players
Brazilian expatriate footballers
Brazilian expatriate sportspeople in Azerbaijan
Expatriate footballers in Azerbaijan